Myrmecia banksi is a species of ant in the genus Myrmecia. Described by Robert Taylor in 2015, the species is endemic to Australia in New South Wales, where it is normally found on low elevations along coastal regions.

References

Myrmeciinae
Hymenoptera of Australia
Insects described in 2015
Endemic fauna of Australia